Zabrus (Pelor) spinipes is a species of ground beetle belonging to the family Carabidae, genus Zabrus, subgenus Pelor.

Subspecies
There are four subspecies of Z. spinipes:
Zabrus spinipes insignis J. Müller, 1931
Zabrus spinipes rugosus (Ménétries, 1832)
Zabrus spinipes spinipes (Fabricius, 1798)
Zabrus spinipes stevenii (Fischer von Waldheim, 1817)

Description
The head is large, almost oval. Elitrae are elongated, with light longitudinal striae. Body color is bright black.

Distribution
This species can be found in Albania Austria, Bulgaria, Czech Republic, Greece Hungary, Moldova, Poland, North Macedonia, Slovakia, Ukraine, southern part of Russia (including Near East) and all states of former Yugoslavia (except for Croatia, Slovenia, Bosnia and Herzegovina).

Gallery

References

External links
 Beetles and Coleopterologists

Beetles described in 1798
Beetles of Asia
Beetles of Europe
Zabrus